Jesse P. Douglas is an American actress, lending her talents to Jessie Bannon in The Real Adventures of Jonny Quest. When asked about Jessie's inclusion, Jesse Douglas stated, "I'd be bummed if I upset anybody. Jessie is pretty cool. It is not like she is a girl who is whining all the time. If anything, she is a really good springboard for the rest of the storyline." Roth supported her, claiming that "Jonny hasn't discovered girls yet but when he does Jessie would be the type of girl he'd like to be with...I think something will happen between them but right now Jess is his best friend." Fred Seibert agreed, hinting that as adults "there might be a Tracy/Hepburn thing going on."

References

External links

Living people
Year of birth missing (living people)